Tomás Fernández may refer to:

 Tomás Fernández (footballer, born 1915), Cuban forward for the Cuba national football team
 Tomas Fernandez (footballer, born 1989), Swedish midfielder for Gefle IF
 Tomás Fernández (footballer, born 1998), Argentine forward for Club Agropecuario Argentino